Rubén Sobrino Pozuelo (born 1 June 1992) is a Spanish professional footballer who plays as a forward for La Liga club Cádiz CF.

Club career

Real Madrid C
In July 2008, 16-year-old Sobrino joined Real Madrid's Juvenil B team. In 2011–12, he made his senior debut as a 77th-minute substitute for Fran Sol in Real Madrid C's match against Rayo Majadahonda. In 2012–13, he played his first Segunda División B match, starting against Caudal Deportivo.

Real Madrid Castilla
On 26 May 2013, Sobrino made his first appearance with Real Madrid Castilla, coming on as a substitute for Jesé in an eventual 1–1 draw at Elche.

Ponferradina
After Castilla's relegation, he moved to Ponferradina on 7 August 2014.

Manchester City
On 28 August 2015, Sobrino was transferred to Manchester City for a €250,000 fee plus 200,000 on variables.

Loan to Girona
He was immediately sent on loan to Girona in a season-long deal. On 14 July 2016, he was loaned to La Liga club Alavés for one year with an option to an extension for an additional year.

Sobrino made his debut in the main category of the Spanish football on 16 October 2016, replacing Aleksandar Katai in a 1–1 home draw against Málaga. His first goal in the competition came the following 5 February, as he netted the first in a 4–2 away win against Sporting de Gijón.

Alavés
On 6 July 2017, Manchester City announced Sobrino would join Alavés on a permanent four-year contract after playing with the club on loan the previous season.

Valencia
On 31 January 2019, he moved to fellow first division side Valencia CF on a three-and-a-half-year deal.

Cádiz
On 31 January 2021, after featuring rarely, Sobrino joined fellow top tier side Cádiz CF on loan for the remainder of the season. On 30 August, he signed a permanent three-year contract with the side.

Career statistics

Honours
Valencia
Copa del Rey: 2018–19

References

External links

1992 births
Living people
Spanish footballers
Association football forwards
La Liga players
Segunda División players
Segunda División B players
Tercera División players
Real Madrid C footballers
Real Madrid Castilla footballers
SD Ponferradina players
Manchester City F.C. players
Girona FC players
Deportivo Alavés players
Valencia CF players
Cádiz CF players
Spain youth international footballers
Spanish expatriate footballers
Spanish expatriate sportspeople in England
Expatriate footballers in England